The 1966 Men's World Outdoor Bowls Championship  was held at Kyeemagh, New South Wales, Australia, from 10 to 23 October 1966.

David Bryant won the singles which was held in a round robin format.

The pairs and triples gold went to Australia which helped them win the overall team competition called the WM Leonard Cup. The fours gold was claimed by New Zealand.

Medallists

Results

Men's singles – round robin

Men's pairs – round robin
Section A

Section B

Final round

+ Position decided on (shots for) if points are tied.

Men's triples – round robin
Section A

Section B

Final round

Men's fours – round robin
Section A

Section B

Final round

W. M. Leonard Trophy
The scoring for the overall team title was four points for the winner of an event, three points for the runner-up, two points for third place and one point for fourth place.

References

World Outdoor Bowls Championship
Bowls in Australia
Sports competitions in Sydney
1966 in Australian sport
World
October 1966 sports events in Australia